Sarma is a feminine Latvian given name. Its name day is December 5th.

Notable people with the name include:
Sarma Melngailis (born 1972), Latvian-American restaurateur
Sarma Sedleniece (born 1939), Latvian chess master

References 

Latvian feminine given names